Roerichiora stigmatica is a moth in the family Cossidae. It is found in India (Darjeeling, Sikkim), Bhutan, Vietnam and Thailand.

References

Natural History Museum Lepidoptera generic names catalog

Zeuzerinae